Quảng Xuyên is former district of South Vietnam. It was established on January 29, 1959, and included communes Bình Khánh, An Thới Đông, Tam Thôn Hiệp and Lý Nhơn. On September 9, 1960, South Vietnam government transferred the district to Biên Hòa province. It was added to Gia Định province in 1970. In 1976, when Gia Định Province was dissolved, it was transferred to Đồng Nai province and renamed to Duyên Hải district. It was merged to Ho Chi Minh City and renamed to Cần Giờ district on February 28, 1978.

Former districts of Vietnam